This is the list of cathedrals in Nigeria sorted by denomination.

Catholic

Latin Church
The following Latin Church cathedrals and pro-cathedrals of the Catholic Church in Nigeria are located in Nigeria:
Cathedral Basilica of the Most Holy Trinity in Onitsha
Christ the King Cathedral in Aba
St. Theresa's Cathedral in Abakaliki
St. Peter and St. Paul Cathedral in Abeokuta
Mater Ecclesiae Cathedral in Ahiara
Immaculate Conception Cathedral in Auchi
Cathedral of St. Michael the Archangel in Awgu
St. Patrick's Cathedral in Awka
Cathedral of St. John Evangelist in Bauchi
Holy Cross Cathedral in Benin City
Our Lady of the Waters Cathedral in Ughelli
Sacred Heart Cathedral in Calabar
St Patrick's Cathedral in Ado-Ekiti
Holy Ghost Cathedral in Enugu
St Mary's Catholic Cathedral in Ibadan
St. Boniface Cathedral in Idah
St. Sebastian's Cathedral in Ijebu-Ode
St. Anne's Cathedral in Ikot Ekpene
St. Joseph's Cathedral in Ilorin
St Paul's Cathedral in Issele-Uku
St Augustine's Cathedral in Jalingo
Cathedral of Our Lady of Fatima in Jos
St. Joseph's Cathedral in Kaduna 
St Peter Claver's Cathedral in Kafanchan
Our Lady of Fatima Cathedral in Kano
St Michael's Cathedral in Kontagora
St. William's Cathedral in Lafia
Holy Cross Cathedral in Lagos
Immaculate Conception Cathedral in Lokoja
St Patrick's Cathedral in Maiduguri
Our Lady of Perpetual Help Cathedral in Makurdi
St. Michael's Cathedral in Minna
Cathedral of Our Lady of Assumption in Nnewi
St. Theresa's Cathedral in Nsukka
St. Benedict's Cathedral in Ogoja
St. Mary's Cathedral in Okigwe
Sacred Heart Cathedral in Akure
Holy Trinity Cathedral in Orlu
St Benedict's Cathedral in Osogbo
St Francis’ Cathedral in Otukpo
Assumpta Cathedral in Owerri
Our Lady of the Assumption Cathedral in New Oyo
Corpus Christi Cathedral in D-line, Port Harcourt
Cathedral of the Sacred Heart of Jesus in Shendam
Holy Family Cathedral in Sokoto
Mater Dei Cathedral in Umuahia
Cathedral of St. Anthony of Padua in Uromi
Christ the King Cathedral in Uyo
Sacred Heart Cathedral in Warri
St Theresa's Cathedral in Yola
Cathedral of Christ the King in Zaria
Our Lady Queen of Nigeria Pro-Cathedral in Abuja
St. Mary's Pro-Cathedral in Calabar
St. John's Pro-Cathedral in Abak

Eastern Rites
The following Eastern Rite Catholic cathedrals are located in Nigeria:

Our Lady of the Annunciation Cathedral in Ibadan (Maronite Rite)

Anglican
The following cathedrals of the Church of Nigeria are located in Nigeria:

Cathedral Church of Christ in Lagos
St Mary Anglican Church in Eguomma, Oguta LGA, Imo State, Nigeria
The Cathedral Church of Emmanuel, Okesha, Ado Ekiti.
The Cathedral Church of St Andrew, Usi Ekiti

See also
Christianity in Nigeria
List of cathedrals

References

Cathedrals in Nigeria
Nigeria
Catholic Church in Nigeria
Cathedrals
Cathedrals